The Thomas H. Hanks House, which was located at 516 E. Woodford St. in Lawrenceburg, Kentucky, was a Greek Revival-style house built in 1858.  It was listed on the National Register of Historic Places in 1980.

It was a two-story three-bay structure.

Demolished c.1982. Mantle shown in photos 4 & 5 was consigned to an antique dealer in Danville, Kentucky. Disposition unknown.

References

Houses on the National Register of Historic Places in Kentucky
Greek Revival houses in Kentucky
Houses completed in 1858
National Register of Historic Places in Anderson County, Kentucky
Demolished buildings and structures in Kentucky
1858 establishments in Kentucky
Demolished but still listed on the National Register of Historic Places